Bay is a city in Craighead County, Arkansas, United States. The population was 1,876 at the 2020 census. It is included in the Jonesboro Metropolitan Statistical Area.

Geography
Bay is located in the Arkansas Delta at  (35.745157, -90.562777).

Ecologically, Bay is located within the St. Francis Lowlands ecoregion within the larger Mississippi Alluvial Plain. The St. Francis Lowlands are a flat region mostly covered with row crop agriculture today, though also containing sand blows and sunken lands remaining from the 1811–12 New Madrid earthquakes. Waterways have mostly been channelized, causing loss of aquatic and riparian wildlife habitat. The St. Francis Sunken Lands Wildlife Management Area, which preserves some of the bottomland hardwood forest typical of this ecoregion prior to development for row agriculture lies east of Bay along the St. Francis River.

History
Located at 35.756882,-90.56504, there are only 2 remaining mounds of society who inhabited the area between 1200 and 1400AD.  The Bay group itself culturally belongs to the Lawhorn Phase, a society which existed along both sides of the St. Francis River north of Marked Tree, Arkansas.

At 3:01 PM on April 27, 2011, a tornado hit Bay as part of the 2011 Super Outbreak.

List of highways 
 Interstate 555

Demographics

2020 census

As of the 2020 United States census, there were 1,876 people, 717 households, and 532 families residing in the city.

2000 census
As of the census of 2000, there were 1,800 people, 690 households, and 518 families residing in the city. The racial makeup of the city was 95.39% White, 2.94% Black or African American, 0.17% Native American, 0.78% from other races, and 0.72% from two or more races.  1.50% of the population were Hispanic or Latino of any race.

There were 690 households, out of which 35.9% had children under the age of 18 living with them, 59.0% were married couples living together, 12.9% had a female householder with no husband present, and 24.8% were non-families. 22.9% of all households were made up of individuals, and 10.9% had someone living alone who was 65 years of age or older.  The average household size was 2.61 and the average family size was 3.07.

In the city, the population was spread out, with 27.7% under the age of 18, 8.2% from 18 to 24, 28.3% from 25 to 44, 22.7% from 45 to 64, and 13.2% who were 65 years of age or older.  The median age was 35 years. For every 100 females, there were 94.4 males.  For every 100 females age 18 and over, there were 88.2 males.

The median income for a household in the city was $29,828, and the median income for a family was $35,833. Males had a median income of $28,594 versus $19,732 for females. The per capita income for the city was $12,743.  About 13.3% of families and 15.5% of the population were below the poverty line, including 21.5% of those under age 18 and 19.7% of those age 65 or over.

Notable person
Wally Moon, baseball player

References

Gallery

Cities in Arkansas
Cities in Craighead County, Arkansas
Jonesboro metropolitan area